The Aquitanian pike (Esox aquitanicus) is a pike native from the Charente to the Adour drainages in France. It was described in 2014.

References

Esox
Freshwater fish of Europe
Fish described in 2014